Tokai University Boarding School in Denmark (TUBS; 東海大学付属デンマーク校中学部・高等部 Tōkai Daigaku Fuzoku Denmāku Kō Chūgakubu Kōtōbu) was a Japanese international school in Præstø, Denmark. It was affiliated with Tokai University. and had junior high school and senior high school students. This school was an overseas branch of a Japanese private school, or a Shiritsu zaigai kyōiku shisetsu (私立在外教育施設). It was founded in 1988, and it closed in 2008.

Bosei Sports High School opened on the former Tokai school campus. This school was established by local Danish authorities in conjunction with Tokai.

References

External links

 Tokai University Boarding School in Denmark (tubs.dk) (Archive)
 Tokai University Boarding School in Denmark (tokai.ed.jp/denmark/ (Archive)

International schools in Denmark
Defunct shiritsu zaigai kyōiku shisetsu in Europe
1988 establishments in Denmark
Educational institutions established in 1988
2008 disestablishments in Denmark
Educational institutions disestablished in 2008
Tokai University
Buildings and structures in Vordingborg Municipality
Boarding schools in Denmark